Annie Corley (born 1960) is an American actress who has appeared in a wide variety of films and television shows since 1990. Her most notable role to date was playing the daughter of Meryl Streep's character in the film The Bridges of Madison County.

Biography
Corley graduated from McCutcheon High School in 1978 and DePauw University in 1982. At DePauw, she majored in communication and participated in student theatrical productions. She also studied at the Actors Studio.

She first appeared in Malcolm X. Since then, she has been featured in several other Oscar-nominated films, such as The Cider House Rules, Seabiscuit, 21 Grams, and Monster.  She co-starred in The Lucky Ones and in 2009 appeared in Crazy Heart and Law Abiding Citizen.

Among her television appearances, she has guest starred on The Closer, NYPD Blue, as the mother of Zachary Quinto on Touched by an Angel, conservative Christian pundit Mary Marsh on The West Wing, Without a Trace, Murder, She Wrote, CSI: Crime Scene Investigation and The Practice.

Corley has made commercials for Lemon Joy and Stove Top stuffing.

Filmography

References

External links

1952 births
Living people
American film actresses
American television actresses
DePauw University alumni
21st-century American women